Tor Obrestad (12 February 1938 – 25 January 2020) was a Norwegian novelist, poet and documentary writer.

Early and personal life
Obrestad was born in Hå on 12 February 1938. His parents were farmer Jon R. Obrestad and Sophie Riise. 

He studied at the teacher's college in Elverum and worked as a schoolteacher, and then studied at the University of Oslo. He eventually became a full-time writer, and was also assigned as journalist for the newspaper Stavanger Aftenblad. He died on 25 January 2020.

Literary career
Obrestad made his literary debut in 1966 with two books, the poetry collection Kollisjon and a collection of short stories, Vind, and received Tarjei Vesaas' debutantpris for these two books. He was a member of the so-called Profil generation in 1968, the circle attached to the literary magazine Profil. He wrote biographies on Arne Garborg, Hulda Garborg, Alexander Kielland and Einar Førde.

His novel Sauda! Streik! from 1972 was adapted for a film directed by Oddvar Bull Tuhus in 1975.

Selected works

 Kollisjon, poetry, 1966
 Vind, short stories, 1966
 Vårt daglige brød, poetry, 1968
 Marionettar, novel, 1969
 Den norske løve, poetry, 1970
 Sauda! Streik!, novel, 1972
 Sauda og Shanghai, poetry, 1973
 Stå saman, poetry, 1974
 Tolken, short stories, 1975
 Baba Anastasia og andre tekster, short stories, 1976
 Stå på! Roman om ein arbeidskonflikt, novel, 1976
 Vinterdikt, poetry, 1979
 Reisa til bestemor, children's book, 1980
 Ein gong må du seie adjø, novel, 1981
 Sjå Jæren, gamle Jæren, short stories, 1982
 Kamelen i Jomarskogen, children's book, 1985
 Misteltein, poetry, 1987
 Seks netter, seks dagar, novel, 1989
 Arne Garborg, biography, 1991 
 Hulda, biography of Hulda Garborg, 1992 
 Forsøk på å halde fast tida, short stories, 1993
 Mimosa, myosotis, rosmarin, poetry, 1994
 Sannhetens pris. Alexander Kielland, biography, 1996
 Jæren. Eld or blått. Ei samling poesi i ord og bilete, poetry, 1997
 Bernhards mor. En drøm, novel, 1998
 Kvinnene i Casablanca og andre historier, short stories, 2002
 Krokodillen Alexander og navigator emeritus, Reinert i Sjøhusgaten. Ei oppbyggeleg fortelling frå ein liten by, children's book, 2002
 Einar Førde, biography, 2007

Awards 
Tarjei Vesaas' debutantpris 1966
Gyldendal's Endowment 1971

References

1938 births
2020 deaths
People from Hå
Nynorsk-language writers
20th-century Norwegian novelists
20th-century Norwegian poets
Norwegian male poets
Norwegian biographers
Male biographers
Norwegian male novelists
20th-century Norwegian male writers